Bagh Bhairab Temple is a historic Hindu temple dedicated to Bagh Bhairab, an incarnation of Shiva as a tiger. It is located in Kirtipur, Bagmati Province, Nepal and dates back to the 16th century. The residents of Kiritpur believe that Bagh Bhairab protects the town. Bagh Bhairab Temple features the swords used by King of Gorkha (later King of Nepal) Prithvi Narayan Shah's army during the Battle of Kirtipur.

References 

Hindu temples in Kathmandu District
Shiva temples in Nepal
Kathmandu District
16th-century establishments in Nepal

External links